YNN may refer to:

Your News Now, the brand for Time Warner Cable's 24-hour cable news television affiliates:
YNN Buffalo, serving Buffalo, New York
YNN Rochester, serving Rochester, New York
YNN Central New York, serving Central New York
YNN Capital Region, serving New York's Capital District
YNN Austin, serving the Austin, Texas area